35th Regiment or 35th Infantry Regiment may refer to:

Infantry regiments
 Kawaguchi Detachment (IJA 35th Independent Mixed Brigade), a unit of the Imperial Japanese Army
 35th Sikhs, a unit of the British Indian Army
 35th (Royal Sussex) Regiment of Foot, a unit of the British Army
 35th Infantry Regiment (United States), a unit of the United States Army

Engineering regiments
 35 Engineer Regiment (United Kingdom), a unit of the British Army's Royal Engineers

Signal regiments
 35 (South Midlands) Signal Regiment, a unit of the British Army

Logistics regiments
 Combat Logistics Regiment 35, a unit of the United States Marine Corps

Artillery regiments
 35th Parachute Artillery Regiment, a unit of the French Army

American Civil War regiments
 35th Illinois Volunteer Infantry Regiment
 35th Regiment Indiana Infantry
 35th Iowa Volunteer Infantry Regiment
 35th Regiment Kentucky Volunteer Infantry
 35th Wisconsin Volunteer Infantry Regiment
 35th Ohio Infantry

See also
 35th Division (disambiguation)
 35th Squadron (disambiguation)